Krave is a chocolate cereal made by the Kellogg Company. It was launched in the United Kingdom in 2010 and marketed under the slogan "Taste Unleashed", later "Here Choccy Choccy" or "It's Time To Melt". It is sold in Europe under the name 'Trésor' or 'Tresor'.

It was introduced in the United States in 2012. In India, the cereal is marketed as "Kellogg's Chocos Fills".

References

External links
 

Products introduced in 2010
Products introduced in 2012
Kellogg's cereals